Derolathrus is a genus of Jacobson's beetles in the family Jacobsoniidae. There are 11 described species in Derolathrus.

Species
These 11 species belong to the genus Derolathrus:

 †Derolathrus abyssus Yamamoto & Parker, 2017 (Cenomanian, Burmese amber)
 Derolathrus anophthalmus (Franz, 1969)
 Derolathrus atomus Sharp, 1908
 Derolathrus cavernicolus Peck, 2010
 †Derolathrus capdoliensis Tihelka et al., 2022 (Cenomanian, Charentese amber)
 Derolathrus ceylonicus (Sen Gupta, 1979)
 †Derolathrus groehni Cai et al., 2016 (Cenomanian, Burmese amber)
 Derolathrus insularis (Dajoz, 1973)
 Derolathrus parvulus (Rücker, 1983)
 Derolathrus sharpi Grouvelle, 1912
 Derolathrus troglophilus (Sen Gupta, 1979)

References

Further reading

 
 

Polyphaga
Articles created by Qbugbot